Nicholas II of Tecklenburg († 1426) was the ruling Count of Tecklenburg from 1388 until his death.

Life 
Nicholas II was the only son of Count Otto VI and his wife, Adelaide of Lippe, a daughter of Bernard V, Lord of Lippe.

Like his father, Nicholas II fought many feuds.  In 1338, he succeeded his father as Count of Tecklenburg.  In his feud against Lippe, he gained the Lordship of Rheda, and had to cede territory to Lippe in return.

In 1400, the bishops of Münster and Osnabrück joined forces and fought against Nicholas II.  He lost northern parts of his territory, such as Cloppenburg, Vechta, Friesoythe and Bevergern to the Bishop of Münster.  In Lower Lingen, he lost half the parish of Plantlünne and Schapen and the forests of Stade and Spelle.  He was left with the oldest part of the County of Tecklenburg-Lingen, including Ibbenbüren, Iburg, Lienen, Ladbergen and other towns.  His territory was complete surrounded by the two bishoprics.

Later in his life, Nicholas II fought further feuds against the bishops of Münster and Osnabrück and the Counts of Hoya.  He assisted his cousin Nicholas of Oldenburg-Delmenhorst, who was Archbishop of Bremen against East Frisia.  In 1426, they lost the Battle of Detern.

Marriage and issue 
Nicholas II married Anna Elisabeth of Moers (d. 1430), a daughter of Frederick III, Count of Moers.  They had the following children:
 Otto VII (d. 1450), Count of Tecklenburg
 Adelheid (d. 1428), married to William VIII of Jülich, Count of Ravensberg

References 

Counts of Tecklenburg
Lords of Rheda
14th-century births
Year of birth unknown
1426 deaths
15th-century German people